David Basheer is an Australian sports commentator and presenter on television network SBS. He is best known for presenting The World Game football show on SBS from 2007 to 2018.

Early life and education
David was born in Adelaide, South Australia , of Lebanese descent and was educated at Prince Alfred College.

Career
David Basheer took over as host of The World Game following the departure of former host Andrew Orsatti. Basheer, alongside Les Murray, hosted SBS's coverage of the European Championships in 2008 and 2012. At FIFA's showpiece event, the World Cup, Basheer was SBS's lead commentator in the 2010, 2014 and 2018 tournaments, becoming the first Australian to commentate a World Cup final in 2010 between Spain and the Netherlands. In September 2022, SBS confirmed that Basheer would return for the 2022 FIFA World Cup alongside Martin Tyler, Niav Owens, Sarah Walsh, Mark Bosnich, Richard Bayliss and former full-time SBS pundit Craig Foster. At the World Cup, Basheer has commentated on Australia's matches, in addition to hosting SBS's 'Socceroos daily show' and the World Cup today show in the build-up for games. Since the 2010 edition of the tournament, Basheer has been accompanied with various co-commentators including Kevin Muscat, Mile Sterjovski, Craig Moore and Craig Foster. 

Basheer was formerly a host and commentator with ESPN Star Sports in Asia hosting and commentating UEFA Champions League, La Liga and Formula 1 as well as hosting the World Cup today show for the 2002 World Cup in Korea and Japan. He was also a commentator for the ABC in the SANFL Australian rules football competition in the early 1990s, and previously delivered coverage for Fox Sport's A-League Men commentary feed in the early 2010s. Additionally, Basheer was a co-commentator on the world feed for the 2016 Summer Olympics football events, providing coverage for the official Olympics channel in the final between Brazil and Germany at the Maracanã Stadium.

In 2013, Basheer's football coverage moved exclusively to SBS, where he formed a commentary partnership with Michael Bridges for A-League Men games. From 2013 to 2017, SBS held the broadcasting rights for one A-League match per round, held on Friday nights, which was simulcast on Fox Sports. In 2014, he lent his voice to the commentary of the cricket video game Don Bradman Cricket 14. David also has extensive commentary experience covering major international events including 5 Olympic Games, 4 Commonwealth Games, Tour de France, World Championships of Athletics and several Grand Slam Tennis events.

References

Australian people of Lebanese descent
Sportspeople of Lebanese descent
Tennis commentators
Sports commentators
People educated at Prince Alfred College
Living people
Australian sports broadcasters
Year of birth missing (living people)